The Organisation pour la mise en valeur du fleuve Sénégal (OMVS; in English Senegal River Basin Development Authority) is an organisation grouping Guinea, Mali, Mauritania and Senegal for the purpose of jointly managing the Senegal River and its drainage basin.

In 1963 a predecessor organization was established, the Organisation des Etats Riverians du Fleuve Sénégal (or the Senegal River Riparian States Organization), with the four border countries—Guinea, Mali, Mauritania, and Senegal—to manage the Sénégal River drainage basin and the river itself. This organization dissolved when Guinea withdrew due to political tensions and the three remaining countries subsequently created the OMVS. Guinea returned to the organisation in 2006.

The OMVS aims to promote self-sufficiency in food security, to improve the income of the local populations, and to preserve the natural ecosystems. The area has a total population of 35 million inhabitants, of whom 12 million live in the river basin, and where malaria control intervention coverage is among the lowest in the world.

OMVS has recently received a high score in a global comparison of indicators of Water Cooperation prepared by international think-tank Strategic Foresight Group. OMVS has a score of 91 in the Water Cooperation Quotient, which examines active cooperation by riparian countries in the management of water resources using 10 parameters, including legal, political, technical, environmental, economic and institutional aspects. The Quotient is calculated on a scale of 0 to 100, with 100 being the best performance. High performance in the Water Cooperation Quotient also means low risk of war between countries in the concerned river basin.

References

External links 
 Official website  (in French)

International organizations based in Africa
International environmental organizations
Senegal River
Guinea–Mali relations
Guinea–Senegal relations
Mali–Mauritania relations
Mali–Senegal relations
Mauritania–Senegal relations